Vents Armands Krauklis (born 3 February 1964 in Valka, Latvian SSR) is a Latvian politician and musician as a member of the famous melodic music band Bumerangs. He was a Deputy of the Saeima and a member of the People's Party. Currently (as of 2020) he is the Mayor of Valka Municipality as a member of the regionalist Vidzeme Party, which nationally is allied to the Latvian Association of Regions.

References

1964 births
Living people
People from Valka
People's Party (Latvia) politicians
Deputies of the 9th Saeima